The Colditz Story is a 1955 British prisoner of war film starring John Mills and Eric Portman and directed by Guy Hamilton. It is based on the 1952 memoir written by Pat Reid, a British army officer who was imprisoned in Oflag IV-C, Colditz Castle, in Germany during the Second World War and who was the Escape Officer for British POWs within the castle.

Plot
During World War II, the Germans transformed Colditz Castle into a high security prisoner-of-war camp called Oflag IV-C. Its purpose was to restrain those Allied prisoners who had attempted to escape from other Oflags and so Colditz housed various nationalities who were mainly British, Dutch, French and Polish. Among the British prisoners are Pat Reid and Senior British Officer Colonel Richmond. Richmond is warned by the Kommandant that "escaping is verboten" but Richmond has no intention of heeding this advice. All the prisoners are wary of Priem, the chief security officer, who is efficient and tenacious.

Reid and other British officers attempt to open a manhole cover one night but are foiled by a simultaneous French attempt which alerts the German guards. Reid and La Tour argue about the lack of co-operation, both blaming the other. Later, a British tunnel is making progress until it meets another being dug by the Dutch officers and a collapse occurs. Richmond decides to act and proposes the creation by each nationality of escape officers who must liaise at all times to make sure attempts do not interfere with each other. This would be on the understanding that the escape officers do not themselves take part in an escape. Reid accepts the post for the British contingent. Soon afterwards, Winslow is hidden among palliasses being taken out of the castle and is not immediately caught.

Richmond gains agreement for his own escape plan which hinges on his impersonation of a feldwebel called Franz Josef. This seems to be succeeding until, at the key moment, the German guards emerge and arrest all concerned. Tyler is shot and wounded. Richmond, Reid and a dozen others are placed in solitary for a month and the likelihood of an informer is first discussed. This turns out to be the case when one of the Polish officers, whose family have been threatened by the Gestapo, is found to be collaborating with the guards and betraying escape plans.

After two weeks on the run, Winslow is recaptured and returned to Colditz. While he is in the solitary compound, he talks to La Tour during a physical exercise session and watches as La Tour, helped by a compatriot, leaps over the barbed wire fence. Winslow runs into a guard to stop him shooting La Tour who runs to freedom. Soon afterwards, Richmond expresses annoyance that no British officer has yet made a complete escape.

Reid's friend McGill approaches Richmond with a new plan but says he will only disclose it if Richmond will relieve Reid from his escape officer duties so that McGill and Reid can make the attempt together. Richmond agrees and McGill convinces Reid that the plan is feasible. The escapees will be disguised as German officers but will approach the guards from the direction of the German mess. McGill argues that previous attempts have failed because the escapees came from the wrong direction. The attempt will coincide with a revue being staged in the castle theatre, to which all senior German officers are being invited.

McGill is very tall and has antagonised the guards many times by reckless behaviour. Richmond realises that he will be too conspicuous and asks him to stand down so that other officers including Reid will have a good chance of making the plan work. McGill accepts Richmond's reasoning but is devastated. Next day, he attempts to scale the wire fence surrounding the exercise compound and is shot dead by the guards. Reid, on learning of Richmond's decision, says he will not let the escape attempt proceed but Richmond persuades him to do it for McGill's sake. The escape goes ahead as planned while the revue is being staged. Four men get out of the castle but two are soon recaptured. Several days later, Richmond receives a postcard with a cryptic message. He announces to the assembled and cheering prisoners that Reid and Winslow have successfully crossed into neutral Switzerland.

Cast
Information sourced to the BFI site.

 John Mills as Pat Reid
 Eric Portman as Colonel Richmond
 Frederick Valk as Kommandant
 Denis Shaw as Priem
 Lionel Jeffries as Harry Tyler
 Christopher Rhodes as Mac McGill
 Richard Wattis as Richard Gordon
 Ian Carmichael as Robin Cartwright
 Bryan Forbes as Jimmy Winslow
 Theodore Bikel as "Vandy", Machiel van den Heuvel
 Eugene Deckers as La Tour
 Anton Diffring as Hauptmann Fischer
 Guido Lorraine as Polish officer
 Witold Sikorski as Polish Officer
 A. Blichewicz as Polish Officer
 B. Dolinski as Polish Officer
 Leo Bieber as German Interpreter
 Rudolph Offenbach as Dutch Colonel
 Keith Pyott as French colonel
 Arthur Butcher as Polish Colonel
 David Yates as Dick
 Douglas Argent as British Officer
 Terence Brook as British Officer
 Frank Coburn as British Officer
 Eric Corrie as British Officer
 John Corrie as British Officer
 Anthony Faramus as British officer
 Eric Lander as British Officer
 Kenneth Midwood as British Officer
 Peter Myers as British Officer
 Claude Le Sache as French Interpreter
 Zygmunt Rewkowski as Polish Interpreter
 Carl Duering as Hauptmann Wagner
 Ludwik Lawiński as Franz Josef
 Peter Swanwick (credited as "Swannick") as Lutyens
 John Heller as German Guard
 Jean Driant as French Orderly
 Jean Bacon as French Orderly
 Frederick Schiller as German Soldier
 Guy Deghy as German Soldier

Production
The theatre revue towards the end of the film, which the inmates use to mask the escape by Reid and Winslow, begins with a parody of the Will Fyffe song I Belong to Glasgow, rendered I Belong to Colditz. Ian Carmichael and Richard Wattis, playing two Guards officers, perform a Flanagan and Allen routine, based on Underneath the Arches.

Reception
The film was the fourth most popular film at the British box office in 1955. According to Kinematograph Weekly it was a "money maker" at the British box office in 1955. It recouped its cost in Britain alone after five months.

However the film performed poorly at the US box office, like most British war movies of this era.

A BBC television series, Colditz, was based on Reid's book and broadcast 1972–74. It starred David McCallum, Robert Wagner, Jack Hedley and Edward Hardwicke.

See also
List of British films of 1955

References

External links
 

1955 films
1955 war films
1950s British films
1950s English-language films
1950s prison films
British black-and-white films
British films based on actual events
British Lion Films films
British prison films
British World War II films
Colditz Castle
Films based on memoirs
Films directed by Guy Hamilton
Films set in castles
World War II prisoner of war films
World War II films based on actual events